2021 Burkina Faso attack may refer to one of the following:
Solhan massacre which took place in June 2021
August 2021 Burkina Faso attack